Mimexocentrus is a genus of beetles in the family Cerambycidae, containing the following species:

 Mimexocentrus medioalbus Breuning, 1957
 Mimexocentrus perrieri Breuning, 1957
 Mimexocentrus seminiveus Breuning, 1957

References

Acanthocinini